Penicillium daejeonium is a species of the genus of Penicillium which was isolated from grape and schisandra fruit in Korea.

See also
 List of Penicillium species

References 

daejeonium
Fungi described in 2013